The Willys Jeep Station Wagon, Jeep Utility Wagon and Jeep Panel Delivery are automobiles produced by Willys  and Kaiser Jeep in the United States from 1946 to 1964, with production in Argentina and Brazil continuing until 1970 and 1977 respectively. They were the first mass-market all-steel station wagons designed and built as a passenger vehicle.

With over 300,000 wagons and its variants built in the U.S., it was one of Willys' most successful post-World War II models.

For some time after the 1949 introduction of a four-wheel drive option, the 2WD was sold as "Station Wagon", while the 4WD was marketed as "Utility Wagon". The 4WD Willys Jeep Wagon is often considered the first production sport utility vehicle.

The Jeep Wagon was assembled in several international markets under various forms of joint ventures, licenses, or knock-down kits.

Development and reception
The Jeep Wagon was designed in the mid-1940s by industrial designer Brooks Stevens. Willys did not make their own bodies, car bodies were in high demand, and Willys was known to have limited finances.

The steel body was efficient to mass-produce, easier to maintain and safer than the real wood-bodied station wagon versions at the time. Within the first two years of the Jeep Wagon's production, the only manufacturer in the United States with a station wagon that was comparable in price was Crosley, which introduced an all-steel wagon in 1947.

The Jeep Wagon was the first Willys product with independent front suspension. Barney Roos, Willys' chief engineer, developed a system based on a transverse seven-leaf spring. The system, called "Planadyne" by Willys, was similar in concept to the "planar" suspension Roos had developed for Studebaker in the mid-1930s.

In 1953 the U.S. military included the 4x4 station wagon models 463 and 473 as non (standard) classified 1/4-ton trucks under Standard Nomenclature List number G-740 in Technical Manual edition TM9-2800-1.

Production timeline

United States 
 1946: introduced as the 463 with 10 slot flat grille in July 1946, powered by the L-134 Go-Devil flathead inline-four engine.
 1947: a panel van introduced with one seat, a pair of doors instead of the wagon's tailgate, and no side windows behind the front doors. 663 model introduced late in year, powered by the L-148 Lightning straight-six engine, 50 built.
 1948: A luxury version, the Station Sedan, had solid body colors with basket-weave trim on the sides and was better finished than the wagon throughout.
 1949: four-wheel drive became an option.
 1950: the flat 10 slot grille was replaced by a pointed v-shape design with five horizontal bars across the vertical ones. New 1950 model introduced April 16, leftover 1949 models continued into March. The 473 model got the new 'F-134 Hurricane, and the 673 model got a new  version of the Lightning six. Station sedan discontinued.
 1952: the flathead Lightning was dropped in favor of the F-161 Hurricane, installed in the 685 model. Key start replaces floor start; chrome strip added to hood, cowl sides on Wagon only; flush side mount tail lights replace single light.
 1954: the first under Kaiser's ownership. The 6-226 Super Hurricane, a flathead inline six, was introduced. This was a version of the Kaiser Supersonic/Continental Red Seal engine and became available on four-wheel drive versions in 1954. Minor revisions were made to front end styling that year, including the reduction of the number of horizontal slats in the grille from five to three. There were few other changes between 1953 and 1955.
 1955: a number of new models were added. The 6-226 model lineup gained stripped chassis, flat face cowl, cowl/windshield, and ambulance models. The 475 line received only the cowl/windshield. Willys withdrew from the passenger car market and renamed the vehicle the Utility Wagon. The seventh seat and the overdrive were deleted, and the Planadyne front suspension used with the two-wheel drive wagon was replaced with a beam axle. Warn hubs, with which the front drive mechanism could be disengaged by turning the hubs by hand, became optional on four-wheel drive models.
 1958: the Maverick model introduced, a more luxurious version of the two-wheel drive wagon. It could be had only with the four-cylinder engine. The main upgrades were in the introduction of two-tone paint with matching interior in two tones and the standard AM radio. It was distinguished by its extra stainless steel trim ring under the windows. The Maverick name came from the TV series of the same name, of which Willys was a sponsor.
 1959: 4X2 Wagon models have one piece windshield.
 1960: 4X4 Wagons and Delivery models receive one-piece windshield (late year).
 1962: the 6-230 Tornado OHC engine was introduced in May, replacing the flathead.
 1964: production ends as the Willys model had been phased out by the Jeep Wagoneer, which was introduced in the 1963 model year. Some leftover 1964 models were renumbered by dealers with 1965 VINs.

Argentina 
The Jeep Wagon was produced as the IKA Estanciera by Industrias Kaiser Argentina from 1957 to 1970.

Brazil 
In the 1950s a version based on the 1946 US version was introduced. A truck version, the Pick Up, was introduced in 1961. Ford Brazil bought the Willys factory in 1967 and the Rural Jeep wagon was renamed Ford Rural, and the truck was later named the Ford F-75 in 1972. Both models were offered with an inline-six engine which was the first gasoline engine manufactured in Brazil. They were available in RWD or 4X4 configuration. The Rural was discontinued in 1977 and the F-75 in 1981.

Notes

References

External links 

 4-door Willys Wagon auctioned — one of very few that were factory built.

Mid-size sport utility vehicles
Jeep Station Wagon
Jeep Station Wagon
Kaiser Motors
Cars introduced in 1946
1950s cars
1960s cars
Motor vehicles manufactured in the United States
Cars of Brazil
Panel trucks
Carryalls
Cars of Argentina